David Couzinet (born 7 June 1975 in Toulouse, France) is a French international rugby union player. He played as a Lock for Agen and USA Perpignan. 
He started his professional career at Stade Toulousain. He moved to SU Agen where he lost the final of the Top 14 against Biarritz Olympique. After the summer he joined it. With Biarritz Olympique he was finalist of the Heineken Cup in 2005 and he won twice Top 14.

External links

1975 births
French rugby union players
Living people
France international rugby union players
Rugby union locks